Pskov (see also names in other languages) is a city in northwestern Russia and the administrative center of Pskov Oblast, located about  east of the Estonian border, on the Velikaya River. Population: 

Pskov is one of the oldest cities in Russia. During the Middle Ages, it served as the capital of the Pskov Republic and was a trading post of the Hanseatic League before it was incorporated into the Grand Duchy of Moscow and became an important border fortress in the Tsardom of Russia.

History

Early history

Pskov is one of the oldest cities in Russia. The name of the city, originally Pleskov (historic Russian spelling), may be loosely translated as "[the town] of purling waters". It was historically known in English as Plescow. 

Its earliest mention comes in 903, which records that Igor of Kiev married a local lady, Olga (later Saint Olga of Kiev). Pskovians sometimes take this year as the city's foundation date, and in 2003 a great jubilee took place to celebrate Pskov's 1,100th anniversary.

The first prince of Pskov was Vladimir the Great's youngest son Sudislav. Once imprisoned by his brother Yaroslav, he was not released until the latter's death several decades later. In the 12th and 13th centuries, the town adhered politically to the Novgorod Republic. In 1241, it was taken by the Teutonic Knights, but Alexander Nevsky recaptured it several months later during a legendary campaign dramatized in Sergei Eisenstein's 1938 movie Alexander Nevsky.

In order to secure their independence from the knights, the Pskovians elected a Lithuanian prince, named Daumantas, a Roman Catholic converted to Orthodox faith and known in Russia as Dovmont, as their military leader and prince in 1266. Having fortified the town, Daumantas routed the Teutonic Knights at Rakvere and overran much of Estonia. His remains and sword are preserved in the local kremlin, and the core of the citadel, erected by him, still bears the name of "Dovmont's town".

Pskov Republic

By the 14th century, the town functioned as the capital of a de facto sovereign republic. Its most powerful force was the merchants who traded with the Hanseatic League. Pskov's independence was formally recognized by Novgorod in 1348. Several years later, the veche promulgated a law code (called the Pskov Charter), which was one of the principal sources of the all-Russian law code issued in 1497.

Already in the 13th century German merchants were present in Zapskovye area of Pskov and the Hanseatic League had a trading post in the same area in the first half of 16th century which moved to Zavelichye after a fire in 1562. The wars with Livonian Order, Poland-Lithuania and Sweden interrupted the trade but it was maintained until the 17th century, with Swedish merchants gaining the upper hand eventually.

The importance of the city made it the subject of numerous sieges throughout its history. The Pskov Krom (or Kremlin) withstood twenty-six sieges in the 15th century alone. At one point, five stone walls ringed it, making the city practically impregnable. A local school of icon-painting flourished, and the local masons were considered the best in Russia. Many peculiar features of Russian architecture were first introduced in Pskov.

Grand Duchy of Moscow

Finally, in 1510, the city was annexed by the Grand Duchy of Moscow. Three hundred families were deported from Pskov to central Russia and merchants and military families from Muscovy were settled in the city. At this time Pskov had at least 6,500 households and the population of more than 30,000 and was one of the three biggest cities of Muscovy, alongside Moscow and Novgorod.

Tsardom of Russia

The deportation of noble families to Moscow under Ivan IV in 1570 is a subject of Rimsky-Korsakov's opera Pskovityanka (1872). Pskov still attracted enemy armies and it withstood a prolonged siege by a 50,000-strong Polish-Lithuanian army during the final stage of the Livonian War (1581–1582). The king of Poland Stephen Báthory undertook some thirty-one attacks to storm the city, which was defended mainly by civilians. Even after one of the city walls was broken, the Pskovians managed to fill the gap and repel the attack. "A big city, it is like Paris", wrote Báthory's secretary about Pskov.

The estimates of the population of Pskov land in the middle of 16th century range from 150 to 300 thousand. Famines, epidemics (especially the epidemic of 1552) and the warfare led to a five-fold decrease of the population by 1582-1585 due to mortality and migration.

The city withstood a siege by the Swedish in 1615. The successful defence of the city led to the peace negotiations culminating in the Treaty of Stolbovo.

Russian Empire

Peter the Great's conquest of Estonia and Livonia during the Great Northern War in the early 18th century spelled the end of Pskov's traditional role as a vital border fortress and a key to Russia's interior. As a consequence, the city's importance and well-being declined dramatically, although it served as a seat of separate Pskov Governorate since 1777.

During World War I, Pskov became the headquarters for Russia's Northern Front, commanded by Nikolai Ruzsky.  On 15 March 1917, aboard the Imperial train,  Tsar Nicholas II abdicated here. After the Russo-German Brest-Litovsk Peace Conference (December 22, 1917 – March 3, 1918), the Imperial German Army invaded the area. 

Pskov was also occupied by the Estonian army between 25 May 1919 and 28 August 1919 during the Estonian War of Independence when the White Russian commander Stanisław Bułak-Bałachowicz became the military administrator of Pskov. He personally ceded most of his responsibilities to a democratically elected municipal duma and focused on both cultural and economical recovery of the war-impoverished city. He also put an end to censorship of press and allowed for creation of several socialist associations and newspapers.

Recent history
Under the Soviet government, large parts of the city were rebuilt, many ancient buildings, particularly churches, were demolished to give space for new constructions. During World War II, the medieval citadel provided little protection against modern artillery of the Wehrmacht, and Pskov suffered substantial damage during the German occupation from July 9, 1941 until July 23, 1944. A huge portion of the population died during the war, and Pskov has since struggled to regain its traditional position as a major industrial and cultural center of western Russia.

Administrative and municipal status
Pskov is the administrative center of the oblast and, within the framework of administrative divisions, it also serves as the administrative center of Pskovsky District, even though it is not a part of it. As an administrative division, it is incorporated separately as the City of Pskov—an administrative unit with the status equal to that of the districts. As a municipal division, the City of Pskov is incorporated as Pskov Urban Okrug.

Landmarks and sights

Pskov still preserves much of its medieval walls, built from the 13th century on. Its medieval citadel is called either the Krom or the Kremlin. Within its walls rises the  Trinity Cathedral, founded in 1138 and rebuilt in the 1690s. The cathedral contains the tombs of saint princes Vsevolod (died in 1138) and Dovmont (died in 1299). Other ancient cathedrals adorn the Mirozhsky Monastery (completed by 1152), famous for its 12th-century frescoes, St. John's (completed by 1243), and the Snetogorsky monastery (built in 1310 and stucco-painted in 1313).

Pskov is exceedingly rich in tiny, squat, picturesque churches, dating mainly from the 15th and the 16th centuries. There are many dozens of them, the most notable being St. Basil's on the Hill (1413), St. Kozma and Demian's near the Bridge (1463), St. George's from the Downhill (1494), Assumption from the Ferryside (1444, 1521), and St. Nicholas' from Usokha (1536). The 17th-century residential architecture is represented by merchant mansions, such as the Salt House, the Pogankin Palace, and the Trubinsky mansion.

Among the sights in the vicinity of Pskov are Izborsk, a seat of Rurik's brother in the 9th century and one of the most formidable fortresses of medieval Russia; the Pskov Monastery of the Caves, the oldest continually functioning monastery in Russia (founded in the mid-15th century) and a magnet for pilgrims from all over the country; the 16th-century Krypetsky Monastery; Yelizarov Convent, which used to be a great cultural and literary center of medieval Russia; and Mikhaylovskoye, a family home of Alexander Pushkin where he wrote some of the best known lines in the Russian language. The national poet of Russia is buried in the ancient cloister at the Holy Mountains nearby. Unfortunately, the area presently has only a minimal tourist infrastructure, and the historic core of Pskov requires serious investments to realize its great tourist potential.

On 7 July 2019, the Churches of the Pskov School of Architecture was inscribed as a UNESCO World Heritage Site.

Geography

Climate 
The climate of Pskov is humid continental (Köppen climate classification Dfb) with maritime influences due to the city's relative proximity to the Baltic Sea and Gulf of Finland; with relatively mild (for Russia) but still quite long winter and warm summer. Further west in Europe on the same latitude, winters are quite a bit milder. Summer and fall have more precipitation than winter and spring.

Gallery

Economy

JSC "AVAR" (AvtoElectroArmatura). Electric equipment production for cars, lorries buses and tractors (relays, switches, fuses, electronic articles)
Pskov is served by Pskov Airport which is also used for military aviation.

Notable people
 Valery Alekseyev (born 1979), professional association football player
 Alexander Bastrykin (born 1953), Head of The Investigative Committee of Russia
 Valentin Chernykh (1935–2012), screenwriter
 Semyon Dimanstein (1886–1938), Soviet state activist, killed in Stalin's purges, a representative of the Soviet Jews
 Oxana Fedorova (born 1977), Miss Russia 2001, Miss Universe 2002
 Mikhail Golitsyn (1639–1687), statesman, governor of Pskov
 Eugeniusz Grodziński (1912–1994), Polish philosopher
 Veniamin Kaverin (1902–1989), writer
 Yakov Knyazhnin (1740–1791), foremost tragic author
 Vasily Kuptsov (1899–1935), painter
 Oleg Lavrentiev (1926–2011), Soviet, Russian and Ukrainian physicist
 Kronid Lyubarsky (1934–1996), journalist, dissident, human rights activist
 Boris Meissner (1915–2003), German lawyer and social scientist
 Mikhail Minin (1922–2008), First soldier to hoist the Soviet flag atop the Reichstag building during the Battle of Berlin
 Elena Neklyudova (born 1973), singer-songwriter
 Afanasy Ordin-Nashchokin (1605–1680), an important Russian statesman of the 17th century.
 Yulia Peresild (born 1984), stage and film actress
 Valery Prokopenko (1941–2010), honored citizen of the city, honored rowing coach of the USSR and Russian Federation
 Georg von Rauch (1904–1991) historian specializing in Russia and the Baltic states
 Nikolai Skrydlov (1844–1918), admiral in the Imperial Russian Navy
 Vladimir Smirnov (born 1957), prominent Russian businessman
 Grigory Teplov (1717–1779), academic administrator
 Aleksander von der Bellen (1859-1924), politician, provincial commissar of Pskov
 Maxim Vorobiev (1787–1855), landscape painter
 Ferdinand von Wrangel (1797–1870), explorer and seaman
 Vsevolod of Pskov, Novgorodian prince, canonized by the Russian Orthodox Church as Vsevolod-Gavriil

Sport 
 Nina Cheremisina (born 1946), former rower
 Mariya Fadeyeva (born 1958), former rower
 Sergei Fedorov (born 1969), hockey player
 Sergey Matveyev (born 1972), former Olympic rower
 Igor Nedorezov (born 1981), professional footballer
 Alexander Nikolaev (born 1990), sprint canoer
 Svetlana Semyonova (born 1958), former rower
 Konstantin Shabanov (born 1989), track and field athlete
 Aleksei Snigiryov (born 1968), professional footballer
 Galina Sovetnikova (born 1955), former rower
 Marina Studneva (born 1959), former rower
 Ruslan Surodin (born 1982), professional footballer
 Valeri Tsvetkov (born 1977), professional footballer
 Nikita Vasilyev (born 1992), professional football player
 Sergei Vinogradov (born 1981), professional football player

Twin towns – sister cities

Pskov is twinned with:

 Arles, France
 Białystok, Poland
 Daugavpils, Latvia
 Gera, Germany
 Kuopio, Finland
 Neuss, Germany
 Nijmegen, Netherlands
 Norrtälje, Sweden
 Perth, Scotland, United Kingdom
 Rēzekne, Latvia
 Roanoke, United States
 Tartu, Estonia
 Valmiera, Latvia
 Vitebsk, Belarus

References

Notes

Sources

Bibliography

External links

  
 Nortfort.ru. Pskov fortress
 The Pskov Power. Archive of the Pskov area of regional studies
 
 
 
 The murder of the Jews of Pskov during World War II, at Yad Vashem website
 
 

 
Cities and towns in Pskov Oblast
Pskovsky Uyezd
World Heritage Sites in Russia
Trading posts of the Hanseatic League